is a former Japanese football player.

Playing career
Yamamoto was born in Yamanashi Prefecture on August 28, 1965. After graduating from Komazawa University, he joined Furukawa Electric (later JEF United Ichihara) in 1988. In 1993, he moved to Japan Football League club NTT Kanto. He returned to JEF United in 1994. He retired end of 1995 season.

Club statistics

References

External links

helvetica.mods.jp

1965 births
Living people
Komazawa University alumni
Association football people from Yamanashi Prefecture
Japanese footballers
Japan Soccer League players
J1 League players
Japan Football League (1992–1998) players
JEF United Chiba players
Omiya Ardija players
Association football defenders